La Tomatina is a festival that is held in the Valencian town of Buñol, in the east of Spain  from the Mediterranean, in which participants throw tomatoes and get involved in a tomato fight purely for entertainment purposes. Since 1945 it has been held on the last Wednesday of August, during a week of festivities in Buñol.

History

La Tomatina Festival started the last Wednesday of August in 1945 when some young people spent time in the town square to attend the Giants and Big-Heads figures parade. The young people decided to take part in a parade with musicians, Giants and Big-Heads figures. One participant's Big-head fell off, as a result of the festivities. The participant flew into a fit of rage, and began hitting everything in their path. There was a market stall of vegetables that fell victim to the fury of the crowd, as people started to pelt each other with tomatoes until the local forces ended the fruit battle.

The following year, some young people engaged in a pre-planned quarrel and brought their own tomatoes from home. Although the local forces broke it up, this began the yearly tradition. In the following years, the boys' example was followed by thousands of people.

La Tomatina was banned in the early 1950s by Francisco Franco due to the festival's lack of religious importance, however, this did not stop the participants, who were arrested. The people protested the prohibition and the festival was again allowed with more participants. The festivity was again canceled until 1957 when, as a sign of protest, a tomato burial was held. It was a demonstration in which the residents carried a coffin with a huge tomato inside. The parade was accompanied by a music band that played funeral marches. The protest was successful, and La Tomatina Festival was finally permitted and became an official festival.

As a result of the report of Javier Basilio,  a broadcaster from the Spanish television program called Informe Semanal, the festival started to be known throughout the rest of Spain. Since then, the number of participants increased year after year as well as the excitement about La Tomatina Festival. In 2002, La Tomatina of Buñol was declared a Festivity of International Tourist Interest by the Secretary Department of Tourism due to its popularity.

The 2020 event, which was to be its 75th anniversary, was cancelled in April 2020 due to the COVID-19 pandemic in Spain. It had only been cancelled once before, in 1957, for political reasons. Due to COVID-19, the 2021 event was also cancelled.

Description

Events during the days before the fight include a paella contest near the town’s square, tomato fireworks, and different music bands and parades around the medieval city center. On Wednesday morning, the first event before the tomato battle is the “Palo Jabón”, centered on a long greased pole with a piece of ham at its top. The goal is for participants to climb the pole and make the ham drop, which requires them to climb on each other. During this effort, other celebrants sing and dance in circles, and all participants are doused with water from hoses. Once the ham falls, the tomato battle commences.

Usually, the fight lasts for about one hour, after which the town square is covered with tomato debris.    Fire trucks then hose down the streets and participants often use hoses that locals provide to remove the tomatoes from their bodies. Some participants go to the Los Peñones pool to wash. The citric acid in the tomatoes leads to the washed surfaces in the town becoming very clean.

Since 2013 participation in the event has been restricted to the 20,000 holders of paid tickets. In 2015, it was estimated that almost  of tomatoes were thrown.

The city council prescribes a short list of instructions for the safety of the participants and the festival:

 Do not throw anything but tomatoes
 Do not tear clothes
 Squash tomatoes before throwing them to avoid hurting others
 Keep a safe distance from trucks
 Stop throwing tomatoes after the second starter pistol shot
 Follow the directions of security staff
 Only throw tomatoes at targets you can see, to avoid hurting others
 Do not throw tomatoes directly at buildings
 Have a great, fun time!

In other countries

La Tomatina Buñol has inspired similar celebrations in other parts of the world:
 Since 1982, the town of Twin Lakes, Lake County, Colorado has held a tomato fight called the "Colorado-Texas Tomato War," in which Texans and Coloradans square off. The Coloradans also attempt to overtake the Texans' straw Alamo effigy, generally succeeding.
 Since 2004 the Colombian town of Sutamarchán holds a similar event on 15 June when a surplus of tomatoes is harvested.
 In Costa Rica the town of San José de Trojas in the San Pedro district of Sarchí canton (Alajuela Province) celebrates a Tomatina during the local Tomato Fair.
 In the town of Dongguan in southern Guangdong province in China, a tomato fight is held on October 19, during which they use up to 15 tons of tomatoes.
 The City of Reno, Nevada in the United States also has an annual hour-long tomato fight that started in 2009. The event seems to take place on the last Sunday of August and is organized by the American Cancer Society. Organizers named the festival La Tomatina, and give full credit for the idea to the Spanish festival.
 In the Indian state of Karnataka, the Karnataka Government banned the hosting of such a Tomatina event in Bangalore and Mysore, after private organizers tried to organize one. Chief Minister D.V. Sadananda Gowda is quoted as saying: "In the name of 'La Tomatina' festival, permission should not be granted to waste tomatoes". A similar plan in Delhi was cancelled after received negative response from the public.
 Funtasia Island, Patna hosted a similar La tomatina Holi event on March 26, 2013 at Funtasia Water Park in Patna, India.

In popular culture
 The festival was re-created for the song "Ik Junoon (Paint It Red)" from the 2011 Bollywood film Zindagi Na Milegi Dobara.
 The opening scene of the film We Need to Talk About Kevin depicts the character Eva attending La Tomatina.
 The Movie Spanish Masala has a scene showing the La Tomatina festival.
 The 2007 game Tekken 6 features a stage named "Fiesta del Tomate", based on the Tomatina. The fighters are located in a town in Spain where people in the background are throwing tomatoes to each other. The floor is covered in tomatoes and when an opponent falls, it makes a squishing sound.
 The 2014 British musical film Walking on Sunshine features a tomato fight in an Apulian village. It was shot in Nardò, Italy.
 The 2013 animated series Mickey Mouse episode "Al Rojo Vivo" features Mickey Mouse stumbling across La Tomatina.

See also
 Battle of the Oranges, similar traditional festival in Ivrea, Italy
 Fiestas of International Tourist Interest of Spain
 Running of the Bulls

References

External links

 Official website of La Tomatina
 Ayuntamiento de Buñol - La Tomatina 

August events
Festivals in Spain
Food and drink festivals in Spain
Valencian culture
Tomatoes
Festivals established in 1945